Horch was a car brand manufacturer, founded in Germany by August Horch & Cie at the beginning of the 20th century.

It is one of the predecessors of the present day Audi company, which itself resulted from the merger of Auto Union Aktiengesellschaft (AG) and NSU Motorenwerke in 1969. Auto Union AG in turn was formed in 1932, following the merger of Horch, DKW, Wanderer and the original Audi Automobilwerke GmbH Zwickau, established by August Horch in 1910.

In 2021, Audi reused the Horch name as a flagship trim level for the Audi A8 in China to compete with the Mercedes-Maybach S-Class.

History at a glance
 

August Horch and his first business partner Salli Herz established the company on November 14, 1899 in the district of Ehrenfeld, Cologne in Cologne. August Horch had previously worked as a production manager for Karl Benz. Three years later, in 1902, he moved the company to Reichenbach im Vogtland. On May 10, 1904 he founded the Horch & Cie. Motorwagenwerke AG, a joint-stock company in Zwickau (Kingdom of Saxony). The city of Zwickau was the capital of the South Western Saxon County and one of Saxony's industrial centres at that time.

After troubles with the Horch chief financial officer, August Horch founded a second company on 16 July 1909, the August Horch Automobilwerke GmbH in Zwickau. He had to rename the company because Horch was already a registered brand and he did not hold the rights to the name. On 25 April 1910 the name Audi Automobilwerke was entered in the company's register at the Zwickau registration court. Audi is the Latin translation of horch, from the German verb "horchen", which means "listen!" (compare English "hark"). The Audi name was proposed by a son of one of Horch's business partners from Zwickau.<ref>Audi AG motion picture 1994: 'The Silver Arrows from Zwickau, running time approx. 49 mins.</ref>

In 1932 both companies from Zwickau (Horch and Audi) merged with Zschopauer Motorenwerke J. S. Rasmussen (the DKW brand) and the Wanderer car-production facilities to become the Auto Union corporation of Saxony. The Silver Arrow racing cars of the Auto Union racing team in Zwickau—developed by Ferdinand Porsche and Robert Eberan von Eberhorst, and driven by Bernd Rosemeyer, Hans Stuck, Tazio Nuvolari and Ernst von Delius—became known the world over in the 1930s.

Initial cars
The company initially began producing  and  twin-cylinder engine automobiles near Cologne in 1901.

The first Horch had a  engine, with an alloy crankcase, a unique achievement in those days. It had an open-body design, with lighting provided by lanterns containing candles. It was significant at that time because it used a friction clutch, and had a drive shaft providing power to the wheels.

The firm soon encountered financial difficulty, and Horch sought new partners.

In March 1902, August Horch produced a  four-cylinder car with a shaft drive in Reichenbach in Vogtland. Horch cars were considered more advanced to those being built by Mercedes or Benz (who were then separate manufacturers).

By 1903, Horch built a car with a four-cylinder engine. In March of the following year, he introduced his new car at the Frankfurt Fair.

In 1904, August Horch developed the first six-cylinder engine, which appeared in 1907. In 1906 a Horch automobile driven by Dr. Rudolf Stöss from Zwickau won the Herkomer Competition (equivalent to a 'brand-name' world championship at the time). In the 1920s, Moritz Stauss, a cosmopolitan Berliner, was the principal stockholder of the Horch company. He succeeded in making the Horch brand highly desirable by introducing art into the firm's advertising. He recognized that only a brand emphasising Horch's unique characteristics would be successful.

In 1923, Paul Daimler (a Stauss associate) worked for Horch as the chief engineer for 8-cylinder engines. Horch vehicles were subsequently the first to introduce 8-cylinder engines in series production.

Audi connection
In 1909, the supervisory board (the German equivalent of the Board of Directors) of the corporation forced out Horch. Horch went on to found Audi as Audiwerke GmbH, which became effective on 25 April 1910. The name was a solution to the legal dispute with his old company over use of the Horch brand and a clever play of words ("audi" is the literal Latin translation of the Old German "horch", meaning the imperative "Listen!").

In 1928, the company was acquired by Jørgen Skafte Rasmussen, owner of DKW (from the German Dampfkraftwagen, or steam engine vehicle) who had bought the remains of the US automobile manufacturer Rickenbacker in the same year. The Rickenbacker purchase included their manufacturing equipment for eight-cylinder engines.

Auto Union

Eventually, on 29 June 1932, Horch, Audi, DKW and Wanderer merged to form the Auto Union AG, Chemnitz affiliated group. The current Audi four-ring logo is the Auto Union logo that represents the merger of these four brands. In the 1930s, Horch introduced a new line of smaller and cheaper, but still presentable, V8 automobiles. In 1936, Horch presented the 25,000th 8-cylinder luxury car in Zwickau.

The Auto Union Grand Prix racing cars types A to D, were developed and built by a specialist racing department of Horch works in Zwickau between 1933 and 1939. Between 1935 and 1937 Auto Union cars won 25 races, driven by Ernst von Delius, Tazio Nuvolari, Bernd Rosemeyer, Hans Stuck and Achille Varzi.

Auto Union became a major supplier of vehicles to the German Wehrmacht, such as Heavy standard passenger car (Horch 108), Medium standard passenger car (Horch 901 and Wanderer 901) and Half-track Sd.Kfz. 11. Civilian production was suspended after March 1940. After the war the Auto Union AG at Chemnitz was dissolved and in Ingolstadt, West Germany the new Auto Union GmbH was founded, where civilian car production continued. Due to widespread poverty in postwar Germany, only small DKW vehicles with two stroke engines were produced. After Auto Union was purchased in 1964 by the Volkswagenwerk AG, the old brand Audi was introduced again, together with the new four stroke vehicle Audi F103.  Daimler-Benz retained the trademark rights to the Horch brand until the mid 1980s. Daimler-Benz then transferred the rights to the Horch brand name to Audi which in turn signed a waiver to use the name „Silberpfeil“ (silver-arrow) for any modern Audi racing car. However, the brand has remained dormant.

The Romanian Army purchased 300 Horch 901 4x4 field cars to mechanize some of its anti-tank companies.

Trabant connection

During the Second World War, the factories suffered heavy bomb damage. Later, the advancing Soviet forces captured the area, and it became part of the Soviet sector of divided Germany in 1945, and later became part of East Germany.

From 1955 to 1958, old Horch factories produced the Horch P240, a six-cylinder car that was respected at the time. The former Horch and Audi operations from Zwickau were unified in 1958. A new brand, Sachsenring, within the East German corporation IFA was born. After unification in 1958, the P240 car was renamed as the Sachsenring P240. As the Soviet Administration inexplicably banned the foreign exportation of the P240, the East German economic administration decided to stop production of the vehicle. IFA also produced the initial Trabant "P-50" model from 1957.

The Zwickau site was acquired in 1991 by Volkswagen, effectively restoring its connection with Audi.

Rare collectibles
On June 24, 2006, a rare 1937 Horch 853A Sport Cabriolet in original unrestored, unprepared condition sold at auction in Cortland, NY for US$299,000.

In the late 1930s, Horch supplied a limited number of promotional scarves bearing the Horch logo. Sent only to the wealthiest drivers, it is a major collectible amongst diehard enthusiasts of the pre-war car era. However, there is also a degree of controversy associated with these scarves as they were commonly sought by senior SS members.

Horch models

See also
 List of German cars

References

 Further reading 
 Horch, August: Ich baute Autos. Vom Schmiedelehrling zum Autoindustriellen. Schützen-Verlag, Berlin 1937.
 Kirchberg, Peter, Pönisch, Jürgen: Horch. Typen – Technik – Modelle. Delius Klasing, Bielefeld 2006, .
 Lang, Werner: „Wir Horch-Arbeiter bauen wieder Fahrzeuge“. Geschichte des Horch-Werkes Zwickau 1945 bis 1958. Bergstraße Verlagsgesellschaft mbH, Aue 2007, .
 Pönisch, Jürgen: 100 Jahre Horch-Automobile 1899–1999. Aufstieg und Niedergang einer deutschen Luxusmarke''. Zwickau 2000, .

External links

 Official Site of August Horch Museum Zwickau
 Zwickau-Views (about 6000 Zwickau pics)

 
1932 disestablishments in Germany
Audi
Auto Union
Defunct motor vehicle manufacturers of Germany
Vehicle manufacturing companies disestablished in 1932
Vehicle manufacturing companies established in 1899
Zwickau
Luxury motor vehicle manufacturers
German companies established in 1899